Silei Etuale (née Poluleuligaga; born 8 March 1981) is a former Australian rugby union player.

Biography 
Poluleuligaga played in the 2006 Rugby World Cup in Canada. In October 2007, she was named in the Wallaroos squad for the two-Test series against New Zealand. She faced the Black Ferns again a year later when Australia played hosts for another test series.

Poluleuligaga was a member of the squad to the 2010 Rugby World Cup that finished in third place. She replaced Margaret Watson in the starting line up in their semi-final match against .

References

1981 births
Living people
Australia women's international rugby union players
Australian female rugby union players
20th-century Australian women
21st-century Australian women